The 2014–15 La Salle Explorers basketball team represented La Salle University during the 2014–15 NCAA Division I men's basketball season. The Explorers, led by eleventh year head coach John Giannini, played their home games at Tom Gola Arena and were members of the Atlantic 10 Conference. They finished the season 17–16, 8–10 in A-10 play to finish in ninth place. They advanced to the quarterfinals of the A-10 tournament where they lost to Davidson.

Previous season 
The Explorers finished the season with an overall record of 15–16, with a record of 7–9 in the Atlantic 10 regular season to finish in eighth place. In the 2014 Atlantic 10 tournament the Explorers lost to St. Bonaventure in the second round.

Off season

Departures

Recruiting

Roster

Schedule

|-
!colspan=9 style="background:#00386B; color:#FFC700;"| Exhibition

|-
!colspan=9 style="background:#00386B; color:#FFC700;"| Non-conference regular season

|-
!colspan=9 style="background:#00386B; color:#FFC700;"| Atlantic 10 regular season

|-
!colspan=9 style="background:#00386B; color:#FFC700;"| Atlantic 10 tournament

See also
 2014–15 La Salle Explorers women's basketball team

References

La Salle Explorers men's basketball seasons
La Salle
La Salle
La Salle